Bonifika Stadium is a multi-purpose stadium in Koper, Slovenia. It is used mostly for football matches and is the home ground of FC Koper. The stadium is part of Bonifika sports complex, together with a smaller athletics stadium, indoor hall and an indoor swimming pool. The stadium was built in 1948 and got its name from the city area where it is situated. In 2010 the stadium underwent a major reconstruction and its current capacity is 4,047 seats.

National team matches

Other events
A concert of the Canadian rock singer Bryan Adams – 7 July 1996

See also
List of football stadiums in Slovenia

References

External links

1948 establishments in Slovenia
Buildings and structures in Koper
FC Koper
Football venues in Slovenia
Multi-purpose stadiums in Slovenia
Sport in Koper
Sports venues completed in 1948
Sports venues in the Slovene Littoral
20th-century architecture in Slovenia